Tuberous sclerosis 1 (TSC1), also known as hamartin, is a protein that in humans is encoded by the TSC1 gene.

Function 
TSC1 functions as a co-chaperone which inhibits the ATPase activity of the chaperone Hsp90 (heat shock protein-90) and decelerates its chaperone cycle.  Tsc1 functions as a facilitator of Hsp90 in chaperoning the kinase and non-kinase clients including Tsc2, therefore preventing their ubiquitination and degradation in the proteasome. TSC1, TSC2 and TBC1D7 is a multi-protein complex also known as the TSC complex. This complex negatively regulates mTORC1 signaling by functioning as a GTPase-activating protein (GAP) for the small GTPase Rheb, an essential activator of mTORC1. The TSC complex has been implicated as a tumor suppressor.

Clinical significance 
Defects in this gene can cause tuberous sclerosis, due to a functional impairment of the TSC complex. Defects in TSC1 may also be a cause of focal cortical dysplasia. TSC1 may be involved in protecting brain neurons in the CA3 region of the hippocampus from the effects of stroke.

Interactions 

TSC1 has been shown to interact with:
 AKT1, 
HSP70
HSP90
 NEFL,
 PLK1,  and
 TSC2.

See also 
 Tuberous sclerosis protein

References

Further reading

External links 
  GeneReviews/NIH/NCBI/UW entry on Tuberous Sclerosis Complex or Bourneville Disease